Aripiprazole, sold under the brand names Abilify and Aristada among others, is an atypical antipsychotic. It is primarily used in the treatment of schizophrenia and bipolar disorder. Other uses include as an add-on treatment in major depressive disorder, tic disorders and irritability associated with autism. It is taken by mouth or injection into a muscle. A Cochrane review found low-quality evidence of effectiveness in treating schizophrenia.

In adults, side effects with greater than 10% incidence include weight gain, headache, akathisia, insomnia, and gastro-intestinal effects like nausea and constipation, and lightheadedness. Side effects in children are similar, and include sleepiness, increased appetite, and stuffy nose.

Common side effects include vomiting, constipation, sleepiness, dizziness, weight gain and movement disorders. Serious side effects may include neuroleptic malignant syndrome, tardive dyskinesia and anaphylaxis. It is not recommended for older people with dementia-related psychosis due to an increased risk of death. In pregnancy, there is evidence of possible harm to the baby. It is not recommended in women who are breastfeeding. It has not been very well studied in people less than 18 years old.

Aripiprazole was approved for medical use in the United States in 2002. It is available as a generic medication. In 2020, it was the 89th most commonly prescribed medication in the United States, with more than 8million prescriptions.

Medical uses 
Aripiprazole is primarily used for the treatment of schizophrenia or bipolar disorder.

Schizophrenia 
The 2016 NICE guidance for treating psychosis and schizophrenia in children and young people recommended aripiprazole as a second line treatment after risperidone for people between 15 and 17 who are having an acute exacerbation or recurrence of psychosis or schizophrenia. A 2014 NICE review of the depot formulation of the drug found that it might have a role in treatment as an alternative to other depot formulations of second generation antipsychotics for people who have trouble taking medication as directed or who prefer it.

A 2014 Cochrane review comparing aripiprazole and other atypical antipsychotics found that it is difficult to determine differences as data quality is poor. A 2011 Cochrane review comparing aripiprazole with placebo concluded that high dropout rates in clinical trials, and a lack of outcome data regarding general functioning, behavior, mortality, economic outcomes, or cognitive functioning make it difficult to definitively conclude that aripiprazole is useful for the prevention of relapse. A Cochrane review found only low quality evidence of effectiveness in treating schizophrenia. Accordingly, part of its methodology on quality of evidence is based on quantity of qualified studies.

A 2013 review found that it is in the middle range of 15 antipsychotics for effectiveness, approximately as effective as haloperidol and quetiapine and slightly more effective than ziprasidone, chlorpromazine, and asenapine, with better tolerability compared to the other antipsychotic drugs (4th best for reducing weight gain, 5th best for reducing extrapyramidal symptoms, best for reducing prolactin levels, 2nd best for prolongated QTc interval, and 5th best for sedative symptoms). The authors concluded that for acute psychotic episodes aripiprazole results in benefits in some aspects of the condition.

In 2013 the World Federation of Societies for Biological Psychiatry recommended aripiprazole for the treatment of acute exacerbations of schizophrenia as a Grade 1 recommendation and evidence level A.

The British Association for Psychopharmacology similarly recommends that all persons presenting with psychosis receive treatment with an antipsychotic, and that such treatment should continue for at least 1–2 years, as "There is no doubt that antipsychotic discontinuation is strongly associated with relapse during this period". The guideline further notes that "Established schizophrenia requires continued maintenance with doses of antipsychotic medication within the recommended range (Evidence level A)".

The British Association for Psychopharmacology and the World Federation of Societies for Biological Psychiatry suggest that there is little difference in effectiveness between antipsychotics in prevention of relapse, and recommend that the specific choice of antipsychotic be chosen based on each person's preference and side effect profile. The latter group recommends switching to aripiprazole when excessive weight gain is encountered during treatment with other antipsychotics.

Bipolar disorder 
Aripiprazole is effective for the treatment of acute manic episodes of bipolar disorder in adults, children, and adolescents.  Used as maintenance therapy, it is useful for the prevention of manic episodes, but is not useful for bipolar depression. Thus, it is often used in combination with an additional mood stabilizer; however, co-administration with a mood stabilizer increases the risk of extrapyramidal side effects. In September 2014, aripiprazole had a UK marketing authorization for up to 12 weeks of treatment for moderate to severe manic episodes in bipolar I disorder in young people aged 13 and older.

Major depression 
Aripiprazole is an effective add-on treatment for major depressive disorder; however, there is a greater rate of side effects such as weight gain and movement disorders. The overall benefit is small to moderate and its use appears to neither improve quality of life nor functioning. Aripiprazole may interact with some antidepressants, especially selective serotonin reuptake inhibitors (SSRIs) that are metabolized by  CYP2D6. There are known interactions with fluoxetine and paroxetine and it appears lesser interactions with sertraline, escitalopram, citalopram and fluvoxamine. CYP2D6 inhibitors increase aripiprazole concentrations to 2-3 times their normal level. When strong CYP2D6 SSRI inhibitors are co-administered (e.g., fluoxetine, paroxetine), FDA recommends dose monitoring, although it is not clear if SSRI dose should be lowered if paroxetine or fluoxetine and aripiprazole are co-administered.

Autism 
Short-term data (8 weeks) shows reduced irritability, hyperactivity, inappropriate speech, and stereotypy, but no change in lethargic behaviours. Adverse effects include weight gain, sleepiness, drooling and tremors. It is suggested that children and adolescents need to be monitored regularly while taking this medication, to evaluate if this treatment option is still effective after long-term use and note if side effects are worsening. Further studies are needed to understand if this drug is helpful for children after long term use.

Tic disorders 
Aripiprazole is approved for the treatment of Tourette's syndrome and tic disorders. It is effective, safe, and well-tolerated for this use per systematic reviews and meta-analyses.

Obsessive–compulsive disorder 
A 2014 systematic review and meta-analysis concluded that add-on therapy with low dose aripiprazole is an effective treatment for obsessive–compulsive disorder (OCD) that does not improve with selective serotonin reuptake inhibitors (SSRIs) alone. The conclusion was based on the results of two relatively small, short-term trials, each of which demonstrated improvements in symptoms. However, aripiprazole is cautiously recommended by a 2017 review on antipsychotics for OCD. Aripiprazole is not currently approved for the treatment of OCD and is instead used off-label for this indication. Depending on the dose, Aripiprazole can increase impulse control issues in a small percentage of people. FDA Drug Safety Communication  warned about this side effect.

Adverse effects 

In adults, side effects with greater than 10% incidence include weight gain, headache, akathisia, insomnia, and gastro-intestinal effects like nausea and constipation, and lightheadedness. Side effects in children are similar, and include sleepiness, increased appetite, and stuffy nose. A strong desire to gamble, binge eat, shop, and engage in sexual activity may also occur.

Uncontrolled movement such as restlessness, tremors, and muscle stiffness may occur.

Discontinuation 
The British National Formulary recommends a gradual withdrawal when discontinuing antipsychotics to avoid acute withdrawal syndrome or rapid relapse. Symptoms of withdrawal commonly include nausea, vomiting, and loss of appetite. Other symptoms may include restlessness, increased sweating, and trouble sleeping. Less commonly there may be a feeling of the world spinning, numbness, or muscle pains. Symptoms generally resolve after a short period of time.

There is tentative evidence that discontinuation of antipsychotics can result in psychosis as a part of a withdrawal syndrome. It may also result in reoccurrence of the condition that is being treated. Rarely tardive dyskinesia can occur when the medication is stopped.

Overdose 
Children or adults who ingested acute overdoses have usually manifested central nervous system depression ranging from mild sedation to coma; serum concentrations of aripiprazole and dehydroaripiprazole in these people were elevated by up to 3-4 fold over normal therapeutic levels; as of 2008 no deaths had been recorded.

Interactions 

Aripiprazole is a substrate of CYP2D6 and CYP3A4. Coadministration with medications that inhibit (e.g. paroxetine, fluoxetine) or induce (e.g. carbamazepine) these metabolic enzymes are known to increase and decrease, respectively, plasma levels of aripiprazole.

Precautions should be taken in people with an established diagnosis of diabetes mellitus who are started on atypical antipsychotics along with other medications that affect blood sugar levels and should be monitored regularly for worsening of glucose control. The liquid form (oral solution) of this medication may contain up to 15 grams of sugar per dose.

Antipsychotics like aripiprazole and stimulant medications, such as amphetamine, are traditionally thought to have opposing effects to their effects on dopamine receptors: stimulants are thought to increase dopamine in the synaptic cleft, whereas antipsychotics are thought to decrease dopamine. However, it is an oversimplification to state the interaction as such, due to the differing actions of antipsychotics and stimulants in different parts of the brain, as well as the effects of antipsychotics on non-dopaminergic receptors. This interaction frequently occurs in the setting of comorbid attention-deficit hyperactivity disorder (ADHD) (for which stimulants are commonly prescribed) and off-label treatment of aggression with antipsychotics. Aripiprazole has been reported to provide some benefit in improving cognitive functioning in people with ADHD without other psychiatric comorbidities, though the results have been disputed. The combination of antipsychotics like aripiprazole with stimulants should not be considered an absolute contraindication.

Pharmacology

Pharmacodynamics 
Aripiprazole was discovered in 1988 by scientists at the Japanese firm Otsuka Pharmaceutical.

Aripiprazole's mechanism of action is different from those of the other FDA-approved atypical antipsychotics (e.g., clozapine, olanzapine, quetiapine, ziprasidone, and risperidone). It shows differential engagement at the dopamine receptor (D2). Aripiprazole is a partial agonist at dopamine D2 receptors, partial agonist at 5-HT1A receptors and an antagonist at  5-HT2A, receptors.

It appears to show predominantly antagonist activity on postsynaptic D2 receptors and partial agonist activity on presynaptic D2 receptors, D3, and partially D4 and is a partial activator of serotonin (5-HT1A, 5-HT2A, 5-HT2B, 5-HT6, and 5-HT7).  It also shows lower and likely insignificant effect on histamine (H1), epinephrine/norepinephrine (α), and otherwise dopamine (D4), as well as the serotonin transporter.  Aripiprazole acts by modulating neurotransmission overactivity of dopamine, which is thought to mitigate schizophrenia symptoms.

There are no studies to date confirming if aripiprazole function as an agonist or antagonist at alpha-adrenergic receptors such as α1A, α2A and α2C, but the orthostatic hypotension observed with aripiprazole may be explained by its antagonist activity at adrenergic α1A receptors.

As a pharmacologically unique antipsychotic with pronounced functional selectivity, characterization of this dopamine D2 partial agonist (with an intrinsic activity of ~25%) as being similar to a full agonist but at a reduced level of activity presents a misleading oversimplification of its actions; for example, among other effects, aripiprazole has been shown, in vitro, to bind to and/or induce receptor conformations (i.e. facilitate receptor shapes) in such a way as to not only prevent receptor internalization (and, thus, lower receptor density) but even to lower the rate of receptor internalization below that of neurons not in the presence of agonists (including dopamine) or antagonists. It is often the nature of partial agonists, including aripiprazole, to display a stabilizing effect (such as on mood in this case) with agonistic activity when there are low levels of endogenous neurotransmitters (such as dopamine) and antagonistic activity in the presence of high levels of agonists associated with events such as mania, psychosis, and drug use. In addition to aripiprazole's partial agonism and functional selectivity characteristics, its effectiveness may be mediated by its very high dopamine D2 receptor occupancy (approximately 32%, 53%, 72%, 80%, and 97% at daily dosages of 0.5 mg, 1 mg, 2 mg, 10 mg, and 40 mg respectively) as well as balanced selectivity for pre- and postsynaptic receptors (as suggested by its equal affinity for both D2S and D2L receptor forms). Aripiprazole has been characterized as possessing predominantly antagonistic activity on postsynaptic D2 receptors and partial agonist activity on presynaptic D2 receptors; however, while this explanation intuitively explains the drug's efficacy as an antipsychotic, as degree of agonism is a function of more than a drug's inherent properties as well as in vitro demonstration of aripiprazole's partial agonism in cells expressing postsynaptic (D2L) receptors, it was noted that "It is unlikely that the differential actions of aripiprazole as an agonist, antagonist, or partial agonist were entirely due to differences in relative D2 receptor expression since aripiprazole was an antagonist in cells with the highest level of expression (4.6 pmol/mg) and a partial agonist in cells with an intermediate level of expression (0.5–1 pmol/mg). Instead, the current data are most parsimoniously explained by the "functional selectivity" hypothesis of Lawler et al. (1999)". Aripiprazole is also a partial agonist of the D3 receptor. In healthy human volunteers, D2 and D3 receptor occupancy levels are high, with average levels ranging between approximately 71% at 2 mg/day to approximately 96% at 40 mg/day. Most atypical antipsychotics bind preferentially to extrastriatal receptors, but aripiprazole appears to be less preferential in this regard, as binding rates are high throughout the brain.

Aripiprazole is also a partial agonist of the serotonin 5-HT1A receptor (intrinsic activity = 68%). Casting doubt on the significance of aripiprazole's agonism of 5-HT1A receptors, a PET scan study of 12 patients receiving doses ranging from 10 to 30 mg found 5-HT1A receptor occupancy to be only 16% compared to ~90% for D2. It is a very weak partial agonist of the 5-HT2A receptor (intrinsic activity = 12.7%), and like other atypical antipsychotics, displays a functional antagonist profile at this receptor. The drug differs from other atypical antipsychotics in having higher affinity for the D2 receptor than for the 5-HT2A receptor. At the 5-HT2B receptor, aripiprazole has both great binding affinity and acts as a potent inverse agonist, "Aripiprazole decreased PI hydrolysis from a basal level of 61% down to a low of 30% at 1000 nM, with an EC50 of 11 nM". Unlike other antipsychotics, aripiprazole is a high-efficacy partial agonist of the 5-HT2C receptor (intrinsic activity = 82%) and with relatively weak affinity; this property may underlie the minimal weight gain seen in the course of therapy. At the 5-HT7 receptor, aripiprazole is a very weak partial agonist with barely measurable intrinsic activity, and hence is a functional antagonist of this receptor. Aripiprazole also shows lower but likely clinically insignificant affinity for a number of other sites, such as the histamine H1, α-adrenergic, and dopamine D4 receptors as well as the serotonin transporter, while it has negligible affinity for the muscarinic acetylcholine receptors.

Since the actions of aripiprazole differ markedly across receptor systems aripiprazole was sometimes an antagonist (e.g. at 5-HT6 and D2L), sometimes an inverse agonist (e.g. 5-HT2B), sometimes a partial agonist (e.g. D2L), and sometimes a full agonist (D3, D4). Aripiprazole was frequently found to be a partial agonist, with an intrinsic activity that could be low (D2L, 5-HT2A, 5-HT7), intermediate (5-HT1A), or high (D4, 5-HT2C). This mixture of agonist actions at D2-dopamine receptors is consistent with the hypothesis that aripiprazole has "functionally selective" actions. The "functional-selectivity" hypothesis proposes that a mixture of agonist/partial agonist/antagonist actions are likely. According to this hypothesis, agonists may induce structural changes in receptor conformations that are differentially "sensed" by the local complement of G proteins to induce a variety of functional actions depending upon the precise cellular milieu. The diverse actions of aripiprazole at D2-dopamine receptors are clearly cell-type specific (e.g. agonism, antagonism, partial agonism), and are most parsimoniously explained by the "functional selectivity" hypothesis.

Since 5-HT2C receptors have been implicated in the control of depression, OCD, and appetite, agonism at the 5-HT2C receptor might be associated with therapeutic potential in obsessive compulsive disorder, obesity, and depression. 5-HT2C agonism has been demonstrated to induce anorexia via enhancement of serotonergic neurotransmission via activation of 5-HT2C receptors; it is conceivable that the 5-HT2C agonist actions of aripiprazole may, thus, be partly responsible for the minimal weight gain associated with this compound in clinical trials. In terms of potential action as an antiobsessional agent, it is worthwhile noting that a variety of 5-HT2A/5-HT2C agonists have shown promise as antiobsessional agents, yet many of these compounds are hallucinogenic, presumably due to 5-HT2A activation. Aripiprazole has a favorable pharmacological profile in being a 5-HT2A antagonist and a 5-HT2C partial agonist. Based on this profile, one can predict that aripiprazole may have antiobsessional and anorectic actions in humans.

Wood and Reavill's (2007) review of published and unpublished data proposed that, at therapeutically relevant doses, aripiprazole may act essentially as a selective partial agonist of the D2 receptor without significantly affecting the majority of serotonin receptors. A positron emission tomography imaging study found that 10 to 30 mg/day aripiprazole resulted in 85 to 95% occupancy of the D2 receptor in various brain areas (putamen, caudate, ventral striatum) versus 54 to 60% occupancy of the 5-HT2A receptor and only 16% occupancy of the 5-HT1A receptor. It has been suggested that the low occupancy of the 5-HT1A receptor by aripiprazole may have been an erroneous measurement however.

Aripiprazole acts by modulating neurotransmission overactivity on the dopaminergic mesolimbic pathway, which is thought to be a cause of positive schizophrenia symptoms. Due to its agonist activity on D2 receptors, aripiprazole may also increase dopaminergic activity to optimal levels in the mesocortical pathways where it is reduced.

Pharmacokinetics 
Aripiprazole displays linear kinetics and has an elimination half-life of approximately 75 hours. Steady-state plasma concentrations are achieved in about 14 days. Cmax (maximum plasma concentration) is achieved 3–5 hours after oral dosing. Bioavailability of the oral tablets is about 90% and the drug undergoes extensive hepatic metabolization (dehydrogenation, hydroxylation, and N-dealkylation), principally by the enzymes CYP2D6 and CYP3A4. Its only known active metabolite is dehydro-aripiprazole, which typically accumulates to approximately 40% of the aripiprazole concentration. The parenteral drug is excreted only in traces, and its metabolites, active or not, are excreted via feces and urine.

Chemistry 
Aripiprazole is a 2,3-dichlorophenylpiperazine class drug and is chemically related to cariprazine, nefazodone, etoperidone, and trazodone. It is unusual in having twelve known crystalline polymorphs.

History 

Aripiprazole was discovered by scientists at Otsuka Pharmaceutical and was called OPC-14597. It was first published in 1995.  Otsuka initially developed the drug, and partnered with Bristol-Myers Squibb (BMS) in 1999 to complete development, obtain approvals, and market aripiprazole.

It was approved by the U.S. Food and Drug Administration (FDA) for schizophrenia in November 2002, and the European Medicines Agency in June 2004; for acute manic and mixed episodes associated with bipolar disorder on 1 October 2004; as an adjunct for major depressive disorder on 20 November 2007; and to treat irritability in children with autism on 20 November 2009. Likewise it was approved for use as a treatment for schizophrenia by the TGA of Australia in May 2003.

Aripiprazole has been approved by the FDA for the treatment of both acute manic and mixed episodes, in people older than ten years.

In 2006, the FDA required manufacturers to add a black box warning to the label, warning that older people who were given the drug for dementia-related psychosis were at greater risk of death.

In 2007, aripiprazole was approved by the FDA for the treatment of unipolar depression when used adjunctively with an antidepressant medication. That same year, BMS settled a case with the U.S. government in which it paid $515 million; the case covered several drugs but the focus was on BMS's off-label marketing of aripiprazole for children and older people with dementia.

In 2011 Otsuka and Lundbeck signed a collaboration to develop a depot formulation of aripiprazole.

In 2013 BMS returned marketing rights to Otsuka, but kept manufacturing the drug. Also in 2013, Otsuka and Lundbeck received U.S. and European marketing approval for an injectable depot formulation of aripiprazole.

Otsuka's U.S. patent on aripiprazole expired on 20 October 2014, but due to a pediatric extension, a generic did not become available until 20 April 2015. Barr Laboratories (now Teva Pharmaceuticals) initiated a patent challenge under the Hatch-Waxman Act in March 2007. On 15 November 2010, this challenge was rejected by the U.S. District Court in New Jersey.

Otsuka's European patent EP0367141 which would have expired on 26 October 2009, was extended by a Supplementary Protection Certificate (SPC) to 26 October 2014., The UK Intellectual Property Office decided on 4 March 2015 that the SPC could not be further extended by six months under Regulation (EC) No 1901/2006. Even if the decision is successfully appealed, protection in Europe will not extend beyond 26 April 2015.

From April 2013 to March 2014, sales of Abilify amounted to almost $6.9 billion.

In April 2015, the FDA announced the first generic versions.  In October 2015, aripiprazole lauroxil, a prodrug of aripiprazole that is administered via intramuscular injection once every four to six weeks for the treatment of schizophrenia, was approved by the FDA.

In 2016, BMS settled cases with 42 U.S. states that had charged BMS with off-label marketing to older people with dementia; BMS agreed to pay $19.5 million.

In November 2017, the FDA approved Abilify MyCite, a digital pill containing a sensor intended to record when its consumer takes their medication.

Society and culture

Regulatory status

Classification 
Aripiprazole has been described as the prototypical third-generation antipsychotic, as opposed to first-generation (typical) antipsychotics like haloperidol and second-generation (atypical) antipsychotics like clozapine. It has received this classification due to its partial agonism of dopamine receptors, and is the first of its kind in this regard among antipsychotics, which before aripiprazole acted only as dopamine receptor antagonists. The introduction of aripiprazole has led to a paradigm shift from a dopamine antagonist-based approach to a dopamine agonist-based approach for antipsychotic drug development.

Research

Attention deficit hyperactivity disorder 
Aripiprazole was under development for the treatment of attention-deficit hyperactivity disorder (ADHD), but development for this indication was discontinued. A 2017 meta review found only preliminary evidence (studies with small sample sizes and methodological problems) for aripiprazole in the treatment of ADHD. A 2013 systematic review of aripiprazole for ADHD similarly reported that there is insufficient evidence of effectiveness to support aripiprazole as a treatment for the condition. Although all 6 non-controlled open-label studies in the review reported effectiveness, two small randomized controlled trials found that aripiprazole did not significantly decrease ADHD symptoms. A high rate of adverse effects with aripiprazole such as weight gain, sedation, and headache was noted. Most research on aripiprazole for ADHD is in children and adolescents. Evidence on aripiprazole specifically for adult ADHD appears to be limited to a single case report.

Substance dependence 
Aripiprazole has been studied for the treatment of amphetamine dependence and other substance use disorders, but more research is needed to support aripiprazole for these potential uses. Available evidence of aripiprazole for amphetamine dependence is mixed. Some studies have reported attenuation of the effects of amphetamines by aripiprazole, whereas other studies have reported both enhancement of the effects of amphetamines and increased use of amphetamines by aripiprazole. As such, aripiprazole may not only be ineffective but potentially harmful for treatment of amphetamine dependence, and caution is warranted with regard to its use for such purposes.

Other uses 
Aripiprazole is under development for the treatment of agitation and pervasive child development disorders. As of May 2021, it is in phase 3 clinical trials for these indications.

Brand names
 Abilify
 Aristada
 Arip MT
 aripiprazole generic drugs

References

Further reading

External links 

 
 

2,3-Dichlorophenylpiperazines
5-HT2A antagonists
5-HT2B antagonists
5-HT2C agonists
5-HT7 antagonists
7-(4-(4-Phenylpiperazin-1-yl)butoxy)-1H-quinolin-2-ones
Alpha-1 blockers
Alpha-2 blockers
Atypical antipsychotics
Treatment of autism
Bristol Myers Squibb
D2 antagonists
D2-receptor agonists
D3 antagonists
D3 receptor agonists
H1 receptor antagonists
Mood stabilizers
Otsuka Pharmaceutical
Wikipedia medicine articles ready to translate
Ethers
Quinolones
Tetrahydroquinolines